The term Islamic tradition may refer to:

Islamic Traditionalist theology,  Islamic scholarly movement, originating in the late 8th century CE
Ahl al-Hadith, "The adherents of the tradition"
Traditional Islamic schools and branches
Islamic mythology, the body of traditional narratives associated with Islam
Islamic philosophy, a development in philosophy that is characterised by coming from an Islamic tradition

See also
Islamic culture